A Line in the Sand is a board game published by TSR in 1991.

History
Paul Lidberg and Douglas Niles designed A Line in the Sand, which depicted the first US-Iraq War; it was one of the projects originating from TSR West, and was published the day the US bombing began thanks to Flint Dille's ability to convince the president of the company to make things move fast. The game made close to $500,000 for the company.

Strategic Simulations published A Line in the Sand, a computer game translation of the board game, in 1992.

References

External links

Board games introduced in 1991
Gulf War fiction
TSR, Inc. games